The Wappinger were an American tribe native to eastern New York.

Wappinger may also refer to:

 Wappinger, New York, a town named for the tribe
 Wappingers Falls, New York, a village located in the Town of Wappinger and the Town of Poughkeepsie
 Wappinger Creek, a tributary of the Hudson River
 Wappingers Central School District
 Kieft's War, also known as the Wappinger War, a 17th-century conflict between the Dutch and the Native Americans